Yousef Al-Askari (born 25 March 1994) is a Kuwaiti swimmer. He competed in the 200 m butterfly event at the 2012 Summer Olympics and was eliminated during the heats; he was also the youngest swimmer to complete in the 2012 Olympics.

Al-Askari was a member of the Kuwaiti team that won a silver medal at the 2011 Pan Arab Games in the medley relay.

References

1994 births
Living people
Male butterfly swimmers
Georgia Bulldogs men's swimmers
Kuwaiti male swimmers
Olympic swimmers of Kuwait
Swimmers at the 2012 Summer Olympics
Sportspeople from Kuwait City